"Union of the Snake" is the ninth single by the English new wave band Duran Duran, released on 17 October 1983.

It was the lead single from the band's third album Seven and the Ragged Tiger (1983), and preceded its release by one month. It became one of Duran Duran's most popular singles, hitting number one on the US Cash Box and peaking at number three on the US Billboard Hot 100 for three consecutive weeks at the end of 1983. Further chart movement was prevented by "Say It Isn't So" by Daryl Hall and John Oates and "Say Say Say" by Paul McCartney and Michael Jackson. It also reached number three on the UK Singles chart.

Background and writing

After a songwriting session near Cannes in France, much of the band's third album was recorded at George Martin's AIR Studios on the Caribbean island of Montserrat with producer Alex Sadkin, then mixed at 301 Studios in Sydney. Mixing for "Union of the Snake" was done right up to the last minute before the tapes had to be turned over to EMI for pressing.

It was originally titled, "The Union at Stake", when the band were interviewed on The Oxford Road Show in March 1983 before their first performance of "Is there something I should know?" on U.K. television.

Lyricist Simon Le Bon (notoriously reticent about explaining his oblique lyrics) hinted in the Duran Duran lyric book The Book of Words that the borderline might be one between the conscious and subconscious minds. In later interviews, he proclaimed that it was a reference to Tantric sex.

Drummer Roger Taylor stated that the beat and drum track was based upon David Bowie's 1983 single "Let's Dance".

Reception
Cash Box said the song "stealthily stalks along on Simon Le Bon’s clenched vocals, but more cautiously [than 'Hungry Like the Wolf'] in the night-time nightmare world depicted in these lyrics."

Music video

The music video for "Union of the Snake" was conceived by Russell Mulcahy, who directed many of the heavy rotation videos for songs from Duran Duran's previous album Rio. However, as Mulcahy was busy preparing to direct the concert film Arena, and the documentary film Sing Blue Silver during the band's world tour, the video for "Union" was actually directed by Simon Milne (who also filmed videos for Kajagoogoo and Missing Persons). There was a bit of controversy surrounding the video as it was released to MTV a whole week before the single was released on radio. Radio stations were anxious at the time because they were concerned that channels like MTV might supplant them in the promotion of singles.

The video, filmed in part in sandhills near Cronulla, features the band being tracked through the Australian desert by a half-man, half-snake creature. They eventually take a lift beneath the sands into what appears to be an underground cathedral (scene shot in the Great Hall of the University of Sydney), where the snake creature and other bizarre characters interact with vocalist Le Bon. The band's other members make only brief appearances in the video.

The use of expensive sets, costumes and makeup foreshadowed the over-the-top nature of videos to come, including a 17-minute epic video for "New Moon on Monday", the massively expensive video for "The Wild Boys", and the extravagant concept/live film Arena.

B-sides, bonus tracks and remixes
The B-side to "Union of the Snake" was the atmospheric piece "Secret Oktober", a collaboration between keyboardist Nick Rhodes and singer Simon Le Bon. Forty-eight hours before "Union Of The Snake" was due to be pressed in the US, the band were informed that they didn’t have a B-side for the single, neither did the band have any material that was appropriate for the B-side. So Rhodes, Le Bon and late producer Alex Sadkin set out to work on "Secret Oktober" at 301 Studios in Sydney, Australia (where the Seven and the Ragged Tiger album was being completed); it had been written, recorded and mixed within the 24-hour period they had to meet the deadline.

Also included on the 12" single was an extended remix of the single, titled "Union of the Snake (Monkey Mix)".

Track listings and formats

7" single: EMI / EMI 5429 United Kingdom 
 "Union of the Snake" – 4:24
 "Secret Oktober" – 2:48

12" single: EMI / 12 EMI 5429 United Kingdom 
 "Union of the Snake" (Monkey Mix) – 6:27
 "Union of the Snake" – 4:24
 "Secret Oktober" – 2:48

7" single: Capitol Records / B-5290 United States 
 "Union of the Snake" – 4:20
 "Secret Oktober" – 2:44

12" single: Capitol Records / 8567 United States 
 "Union of the Snake" (Monkey Mix) – 6:22
 "Union of the Snake" – 4:20
 "Secret Oktober" – 2:44

 "Union of the Snake" (Monkey Mix) is also known as "Extended Mix" or "Super Mix".

Credits and personnel
Duran Duran:
Simon Le Bon – vocals
Andy Taylor – guitar
John Taylor – bass guitar
Roger Taylor – drums
Nick Rhodes – keyboards

Also credited:

Alex Sadkin – producer
Ian Little – producer
Andy Hamilton – soprano and tenor saxophone
Raphael Dejesus – percussion
Mark Kennedy – percussion
Michelle Cobbs – backing vocals
B.J. Nelson – backing vocals

Charts

Weekly charts

Year-end charts

Cover versions
In 2018, the song was covered by Camila Mendes, Asha Bromfield and Hayley Law in the episode "Chapter Twenty-Four: The Wrestler" from the second season of the television series Riverdale.

References

 Music Video Database: Union of the Snake
 The Duran Duran Timeline: 1983

External links
 MTV: Duran Duran Videos (RealPlayer format)

1983 singles
Duran Duran songs
EMI Records singles
Capitol Records singles
Cashbox number-one singles
Songs written by Simon Le Bon
Songs written by John Taylor (bass guitarist)
Songs written by Roger Taylor (Duran Duran drummer)
Songs written by Andy Taylor (guitarist)
Songs written by Nick Rhodes
1983 songs